Monastery of San Clemente (Monasterio de San Clemente) is a Cistercian monastery with the Bien de Interés Cultural designation in the Spanish city of Seville. Architecturally, it is a heterogeneous set of buildings, built in different times and styles, from the 16th to the 17th century.

References

Arco y Garay, Ricardo del (1954). Sepulcros de la Casa Real de Castilla. Madrid: Instituto Jerónimo Zurita. Consejo Superior de Investigaciones Científicas. OCLC 11366237.
Borrero Fernández, Mercedes (1991). El Real Monasterio de San Clemente: un monasterio cisterciense en la Sevilla medieval. Sevilla: Comisaría de la Ciudad de Sevilla para 1992, Ayuntamiento de Sevilla. .
Borrero Fernández, Mercedes (1987). «Un monasterio sevillano convertido en panteón real durante la Baja Edad Media». Anuario de estudios medievales (Madrid: Consejo Superior de Investigaciones Científicas) (17): 133–148. ISSN 0066-5061.
García Fernández, Manuel (1988). «Regesto documental andaluz de Alfonso XI (1312-1350)». Historia, instituciones, documentos (Sevilla: Universidad de Sevilla: Departamento de Historia Medieval y Ciencias y Técnicas Historiográficas) (15): 1–126. ISSN 0210-7716. Consultado el 8 de agosto de 2011.

External links
Official website (in Spanish)

Christian monasteries in Spain
Bien de Interés Cultural landmarks in the Province of Seville
Christian monasteries established in the 16th century